Dan Shumow is a cryptographer working at Microsoft Research.

At the CRYPTO 2007 conference rump session, Dan Shumow and Niels Ferguson presented an informal paper describing a kleptographic backdoor in the NIST specified Dual_EC_DRBG cryptographically secure pseudorandom number generator.  The backdoor was confirmed to be real in 2013 as part of the Edward Snowden leaks.

Dan Shumow co-authored an algorithm for detecting SHA-1 collisions with Marc Stevens, prior to the demonstration of a SHA-1 collision.

References

External links
 Dan Shumow - Microsoft Research

Modern cryptographers
Living people
Year of birth missing (living people)
Place of birth missing (living people)
Microsoft Research people